The 2022 Utah Utes football team represented the University of Utah as a member of the Pac-12 Conference during the 2022 NCAA Division I FBS football season. Led by 18th-year head coach Kyle Whittingham the Utes played their home games at Rice–Eccles Stadium in Salt Lake City. The Utes finished the season 10–4, 7–2 in Pac-12 play to finish in a three-way tie for second place. Due to tiebreaking rules, Utah received the bid to the Pac 12 Championship Game. There they defeated No. 4-ranked USC for the second time on the season to win the conference championship. As a result, they received a bid to the Rose Bowl for the second consecutive year where they lost to Penn State.

Previous season

The Utes finished the 2021 season 10–4, 8–1 in Pac-12 play to win the South division. As a result, the Utes earned a trip to the Pac-12 championship game. There they defeated Oregon to earn the school's first Pac-12 championship. As a result, the Utes received a bid to the school's first-ever Rose Bowl where they lost to Ohio State.

Preseason 
In the preseason polls released on July 28, Utah was picked to finish the season as the top team in the conference.

Schedule

Roster

Game summaries

at Florida

vs Southern Utah (FCS)

vs San Diego State

at Arizona State

vs Oregon State

at No. 18 UCLA

vs No. 7 USC

at Washington State

vs Arizona

vs Stanford

at No. 12 Oregon

at Colorado

vs No. 4 USC (Pac-12 Championship Game)

vs No. 11 Penn State (Rose Bowl)

Rankings

References

Utah
Utah Utes football seasons
Pac-12 Conference football champion seasons
Utah Utes football